Chromis xanthura is a species of damselfish found in the Pacific Ocean. 

It occasionally makes its way into the aquarium trade.

Description
It grows to a size of 15 cm in length.

References

External links
 

xanthura
Fish described in 1854